Tellona is a genus of skippers in the family Hesperiidae. It is monotypic, being represented by the single species Tellona variegata.

References
Natural History Museum Lepidoptera genus database

Hesperiinae
Hesperiidae genera